Aarzemnieki (an internet style writing of the Latvian word "ārzemnieki", meaning "foreigners") are a Latvian band that represented Latvia in the Eurovision Song Contest 2014 in Copenhagen, Denmark, with their song "Cake to Bake". The lead singer of the band, Jöran Steinhauer, is German.

References

External links
 

Eurovision Song Contest entrants for Latvia
Eurovision Song Contest entrants of 2014
Latvian musical groups